The 2022–23 Montreal Canadiens season is the franchise's 114th season since its establishment on December 4, 1909, and their 106th season as member of the National Hockey League.

Standings

Divisional standings

Conference standings

Schedule and results

Preseason

Regular season
The regular season schedule was released on July 6, 2022.

Player statistics

As of March 20, 2023

Skaters

Goaltenders

†Denotes player spent time with another team before joining the Canadiens. Stats reflect time with the Canadiens only.
‡Denotes player was traded mid-season. Stats reflect time with the Canadiens only.
Bold/italics denotes franchise record.

Roster

Awards and honours

Milestones

Transactions
The Canadiens have been involved in the following transactions during the 2022–23 season.

Key:

 Contract is entry-level.

 Contract initially takes effect in the 2023-24 season.

Trades

Notes:
 The Tampa Bay Lightning's fourth-round pick went to the Vegas Golden Knights as the result of a trade on July 8, 2022, that sent a fourth-round pick in 2023 to Montreal in exchange for this pick.
Montreal previously acquired this pick as the result of a trade on July 24, 2021, that sent Vegas' fourth-round pick in 2021 (126th overall) to Tampa Bay in exchange for this pick.
 Montreal will have the option to receive Calgary's first-round pick in 2024 if the pick is outside of the top 20. If Montreal declines to exercise this option or Calgary's first-round pick in 2024 is within the top 20, they will receive one of Calgary or Florida's first-round picks in 2025 or 2026. If both Calgary and Florida's first-round picks in 2025 are outside of the top 10, Montreal will receive the earlier of the two. If Calgary's first-round pick in 2025 is in the top 10 and Florida's is outside, Montreal will receive Florida's first-round pick in 2025; if Florida's first-round pick in 2025 is in the top 10 and Calgary's outside, Montreal will receive Calgary's first-round pick in 2025. If both Calgary and Florida's first-round picks in 2025 are within the top 10, Montreal will receive Calgary's first-round pick, unless said pick is the first-overall selection in 2025; if so, Montreal will instead receive the earlier of Calgary or Florida's first-round picks in 2026.
 Montreal will receive Calgary's third-round pick in 2025 if Calgary's first-round pick in 2025 is the first-overall selection and Florida's first-round pick in 2025 is in the top 10 selections; otherwise no pick will be exchanged.
 Montreal will receive Calgary's fourth-round pick in 2025 if both Calgary and Florida's first-round selections in 2025 are outside of the top 10, Florida's draft position is better than Calgary's, and the rights to Florida's first-round pick in 2025 are with another team; otherwise no pick will be exchanged.
 The Canadiens will retain 50% of Dadonov's salary until the end of the current season.
 The Canadiens will retain 50% of Bonino's salary until the end of the current season.
 San Jose will receive Pittsburgh's fourth-round pick in 2024 should the Penguins reach the 2023 Eastern Conference Finals; otherwise the pick will not convert from a fifth-round selection.

Players acquired

Players lost

Signings

Draft picks

Below are the Montreal Canadiens' selections at the 2022 NHL Entry Draft, which was held on July 7–8, 2022 at the Bell Centre in Montreal, Quebec.

Notes:
 The Calgary Flames' first-round pick went to the Montreal Canadiens as the result of a trade on February 14, 2022, that sent Tyler Toffoli to Calgary in exchange for Tyler Pitlick, Emil Heineman, a fifth-round pick in 2023, a conditional fourth-round pick in 2024 and this pick (being conditional at the time of the trade). The condition – Montreal will receive a first-round pick in 2022 if Calgary's first-round pick is outside of the top ten selections – was converted when the Flames qualified for the 2022 Stanley Cup playoffs on April 16, 2022.
 The Edmonton Oilers' second-round pick went to the Montreal Canadiens as the result of a trade on March 21, 2022, that sent Brett Kulak to Edmonton in exchange for William Lagesson, a seventh-round pick in 2024 and this pick (being conditional at the time of the trade). The condition – Montreal will receive a second-round pick in 2022 if Edmonton does not qualify for the 2022 Stanley Cup Finals – was converted on June 6, 2022.
 The Anaheim Ducks' third-round pick went to the Montreal Canadiens as the result of a trade on July 24, 2021, that sent Chicago's third-round pick in 2021 (76th overall) to Anaheim in exchange for this pick.
 The Carolina Hurricanes' third-round pick went to the Montreal Canadiens as compensation for not matching an offer sheet from Carolina to restricted free agent Jesperi Kotkaniemi on September 4, 2021.
 The New York Rangers' fourth-round pick went to the Montreal Canadiens as the result of a trade on March 16, 2022, that sent Ben Chiarot to Florida in exchange for Ty Smilanic, a conditional first-round pick in 2023 and this pick being conditional at the time of the trade. The condition – Montreal will receive the lowest of the Rangers' or Jets' fourth-round pick in 2022. – was converted when the Rangers clinched a spot in the 2022 Stanley Cup playoffs on April 9, 2022, and when the Jets were eliminated from the playoffs on April 20, 2022.
 The St. Louis Blues' seventh-round pick went to the Montreal Canadiens as the result of a trade on July 24, 2021, that sent a seventh-round pick in 2021 to Arizona in exchange for this pick.

References

2022–23 NHL season by team
2022–23 in Canadian ice hockey by team
Montreal Canadiens seasons
2020s in Montreal